Zizyphomyia is a genus of flies in the family Tachinidae.

Species
Z. angusta Reinhard, 1967
Z. chihuahuensis (Townsend, 1892)
Z. crescentis (Reinhard, 1944)
Z. limata (Coquillett, 1902)

References

Diptera of North America
Exoristinae
Tachinidae genera
Taxa named by Charles Henry Tyler Townsend